The 1990 PBA All-Star Game is the second all-star weekend of the Philippine Basketball Association (PBA). The events were held on June 3, 1990, at The ULTRA in Pasig, coinciding the league's 1990 season.

PBL North-South showdown

Rosters

North:
Johnny Abarrientos (Crispa 400)
Johnedel Cardel (Magnolia Ice Cream)
Art dela Cruz (Sta. Lucia Realtors)
Jayvee Gayoso (Philips Sardines)
Joey Guanio (Philips Sardines)
Bong Hawkins (Crispa 400)
Vergel Meneses (Burger City Masters)
Victor Pablo (Crispa 400)
Silverio Palad (Philips Sardines)
Eugene Quilban (Sta. Lucia Realtors)
Eric Reyes (Sarsi Bottlers)
Ferdinand Santos (Sarsi Bottlers)
Coach: Francis Rodriguez (Sta. Lucia Realtors)

South:
Bonel Balingit (Magnolia Ice Cream)
Noli Banate (Agfa XRG)
Emil Chuatico (Magnolia Ice Cream)
Felix Duhig (Crispa 400)
Jun Jabar (Crispa 400)
Jun Limpot (Magnolia Ice Cream)
Edgar Macaraya (Sta. Lucia Realtors)
Tata Marata (Philips Sardines)
Peter Naron (Burger City Masters)
Bong Ravena (Burger City Masters)
Allen Sasan (Burger City Masters)
Mark Anthony Tallo (Magnolia Ice Cream)
Coach: Derrick Pumaren (Magnolia Ice Cream)

Game

All-Star Game

Rosters

Rookies-Sophomores-Juniors:
Paul Alvarez (Alaska)
Nelson Asaytono (Purefoods)
Boy Cabahug (Alaska)
Jerry Codiñera (Purefoods)
Peter Jao (Presto)
Gerald Esplana (Presto)
Jojo Lastimosa (Purefoods)
Ronnie Magsanoc (Shell)
Ric-Ric Marata (Alaska)
Benjie Paras (Shell)
Alvin Patrimonio (Purefoods)
Dindo Pumaren (Purefoods)
Coach: Jimmy Mariano (Presto)

Veterans:
Allan Caidic (Presto)
Hector Calma (San Miguel)
Philip Cezar (Añejo)
Rey Cuenco (Añejo)
Yves Dignadice (San Miguel)
Ramon Fernandez (San Miguel)
Dante Gonzalgo (Añejo)
Robert Jaworski (Añejo)
Samboy Lim (San Miguel)
Chito Loyzaga (Añejo)
Manny Victorino (Presto)
Elpidio Villamin (Alaska)
Coach: Robert Jaworski (Añejo)

Game

References

Philippine Basketball Association All-Star Weekend
All-Star Game